Road routes in Queensland assist drivers navigating roads throughout the state, by identifying important through-routes. Queensland is in the process of converting to an alphanumeric route numbering system, with a letter denoting the importance and standard of the route. The previous shield-based system consisted of various route types – national highways, national routes, and state routes – with each type depicted by a different route marker design. Some routes have been converted to the alphanumeric system, while other routes are being maintained as shield-based routes – but with signs designed to be subsequentially retrofitted with a replacement alphanumeric route. Tourist drives will continue to use a shield-based system.

Unless stated otherwise, all information in this article is derived from Google Maps.

Alphanumeric routes

Brisbane routes

Regional routes

Active Metroads

National Highways and Routes

State Routes
State Routes on the Gold Coast and in regional Queensland are mostly numbered separately from those of Brisbane. This came into effect in the mid to late 1990s, and some remnants of the old system still remain. All routes east of the Pacific Motorway (then Pacific Highway) and north of the Nerang River changed numbering.

The changes made included:
 87 changed to 2
 86 changed to 10 (to Southport) and 3 (to Burleigh)
 95 changed to 4
 97 changed to 20
 59 changed to 24

Routes 1 to 20

Routes 21 to 40

Routes 41 to 60

Routes 61 to 80

Routes 81 to 99

Tourist drives

Tourist drives in Queensland include numbered and un-numbered routes. Most routes have an official name, but some have been named based on the region in which they occur. Some duplication of numbers exists where the Queensland Government and a local authority have each chosen the same number for use in different regions.

See also 

 List of road routes in the Australian Capital Territory
 List of road routes in New South Wales
 List of road routes in the Northern Territory
 List of road routes in South Australia
 List of road routes in Tasmania
 List of road routes in Victoria
 List of road routes in Western Australia
 List of highways in Queensland

References 

Queensland
 
Road routes